Dodge is a brand of automobiles and trucks.

Dodge may also refer to:

Places

United States
 Dodge, Nebraska, a village
 Dodge, North Dakota, a city
 Dodge, Oklahoma, a census-designated place
 Dodge, Texas, an unincorporated community
 Dodge, Wisconsin, a town
 Dodge (CDP), Wisconsin, an unincorporated census-designated place in the town of Dodge
 Dodge County (disambiguation)
 Dodge Township (disambiguation)
 Fort Dodge (disambiguation)
 Camp Dodge, a military installation in the city of Johnston, Iowa
 Dodge Island, an artificial island in downtown Miami, Florida
 Dodge Street, Omaha, Nebraska
 Dodge Park, North Omaha, Nebraska
 Dodge Reservoir, Lassen County, California
 Dodge (CTA station), a Chicago Transit Authority station
 Dodge Arena, Hidalgo, Texas
 Dodge House (disambiguation), various houses
 Dodge Mansion (disambiguation), two mansions
 Dodge Building, Newburyport, Massachusetts
 Dodge Site, an archaeological site in Ohio

Elsewhere
 Dodge Glacier, Greenland
 Mount Dodge, Antarctica

People 
 Dodge (surname)
 Dodge (given name)

Other uses 
 Dodge (photography), to lighten part of a photograph during printing
 Dodge (cyclecar), manufactured in Detroit, Michigan from 1914 to 1915
 DODGE (satellite) (Department of Defence Gravity Experiment), a satellite launched in 1967
 Coupe Dodge or Dodge Cup, a provincial championship in the men's and women's amateur ice hockey leagues in Quebec, Canada
 Dodge Report is a commercial construction reporting service, operated by McGraw-Hill

See also 
 Dodge City (disambiguation)
 Dodge Line, a policy guiding Japan's economic independence after World War II
 Dodge No. 4 State Park, Michigan
 Dodger (disambiguation)
 Evasion (disambiguation)